Amlaím Ua Muirethaig also known in Latin as Mauricius, was a medieval Irish bishop.

He was styled "Bishop of Ard-Macha and Cenel-Feradhaigh" in the Annals of Ulster and appears to be reckoned as coarb of Saint Patrick in the Book of Leinster, but probably took care over the See of Cinél nEógain. Muirethaig died at Cenél Feradaig Cruthnai in 1185 and is buried at Derry.

References

People from County Londonderry
12th-century Roman Catholic bishops in Ireland
Bishops of Cinél nEógain
1185 deaths